Illana May (born February 1976) is a South African singer-songwriter/guitarist.

She was educated in Messina, (now known as Musina), South Africa at Eric Louw High School.

Averaging over 180 live shows per year, she is the busiest female musician in South Africa. With 7 CDs and a DVD released, her music is popular across Southern Africa.

Whilst performing a wide range of cover songs, she also produces her own original music with a distinct rock feel. She sings in English and Afrikaans, and performs music in the genres of rock, pop, country and western and R&B.

Sources

External links
 Ananzi Site
 Podcast Shows
 Video Yahoo
 Music DB.org listing of CD's
 SA Kunstenaars Website
 Daily Dispatch Newspaper Article
 YouTube site
 Illana May Official Website

1976 births
Living people
People from Masvingo
21st-century South African women singers
South African pop singers